Arsen Borisovich Papikyan (born 1 January 1972) is a Russian former professional football manager and a former player. He is an assistant coach with PFC Krylia Sovetov Samara. He is of Armenian descent.

Career
As a player, he made his debut in the Soviet Second League in 1989 for FC Nart Cherkessk. He was manager of Russian club FC Armavir from 2016 until the club went bankrupt and folded on 15 April 2020.

References

1972 births
People from Armavir, Russia
Living people
Russian people of Armenian descent
Soviet footballers
Russian footballers
Armenian footballers
Armenian football managers
Armenian expatriate footballers
FC Dynamo Stavropol players
Russian Premier League players
FC Chernomorets Novorossiysk players
FC KAMAZ Naberezhnye Chelny players
Russian football managers
Russian Premier League managers
FC Kuban Krasnodar managers
FC Armavir players
Association football midfielders
Association football defenders
FC Spartak Kostroma players
Sportspeople from Krasnodar Krai